is a district located in Kamikawa Subprefecture, Hokkaido, Japan. Confusingly, there is a district of the same name, Kamikawa (Teshio) District, in the h. subprefecture.  In 1869, when Hokkaido was divided into 11 provinces and 86 districts, this Kamikawa District was placed under Ishikari Province.  The name is derived from its location at the headwaters of the Ishikari River, whereas the other Kamikawa District is named after the headwaters of the Teshio River.  There is a third district in Hokkaido with the same name, see Kamikawa (Tokachi) District.

As of 2004, the district has an estimated population of 56,867 and a density of 20.88 persons per km2. The total area is 2,723.49 km2.

Asahikawa Airport stretches over the outskirts of Asahikawa City and Higashikagura in Kamikawa District.

Towns
Aibetsu
Biei
Higashikagura
Higashikawa
Kamikawa
Pippu
Takasu
Tōma

Districts in Hokkaido